Frans Fredrik Wilhelm Ahlroos (22 April 1867, Helsinki - 11 May 1948) was a Finnish typesetter, journalist and politician. He was a member of the Parliament of Finland from 1907 to 1909, representing the Swedish People's Party of Finland (SFP).

References

1867 births
1948 deaths
Writers from Helsinki
People from Uusimaa Province (Grand Duchy of Finland)
Swedish People's Party of Finland politicians
Members of the Parliament of Finland (1907–08)
Members of the Parliament of Finland (1908–09)
19th-century Finnish journalists
20th-century Finnish journalists